Briegitte Marie Gabrielle Baldrica (born July 4, 1990), known professionally as Brie Gabrielle, is an American actress, television host, model and beauty pageant titleholder who was crowned Miss Florida USA 2016. She then competed for the national title at Miss USA 2016. , she was a co-host of the Chevy Florida Insider Fishing Report on Fox Sports Sun (Florida).

Early life
Brie is an actress and model; she acted in several movies, including the 2009 films  Forget Me Not and Spring Breakdown, and the 2012 film Beautiful Wave.

Pageant experience
Brie competed at the Miss Florida USA state pageant as "Miss Palm Beach" and won the title of Miss Florida. As the state titleholder, she represented Florida at the Miss USA 2016 pageant, but did not place.

References

External links

Miss Florida USA

1990 births
Living people
Miss USA 2016 delegates
People from West Palm Beach, Florida
American beauty pageant winners
American people of Italian descent